Kivisili (or ) is a village in the Larnaca District of Cyprus, located  south of Alethriko.  Prior to 1974, it was inhabited solely by Turkish Cypriots. , Kivisili had a population of 233.

References

Communities in Larnaca District